Roblox is an online game platform and game creation system developed by Roblox Corporation that allows users to program games and play games created by other users. Created by David Baszucki and Erik Cassel in 2004 and released in 2006, the platform hosts user-created games of multiple genres coded in the programming language Lua. For most of Robloxs history, it was relatively small, both as a platform and as a company. Roblox began to grow rapidly in the second half of the 2010s, and this growth has been accelerated by the COVID-19 pandemic.

Roblox is free to play, with in-game purchases available through a virtual currency called Robux. As of August 2020, Roblox had over 164 million monthly active users, including more than half of all American children under 16. Although Roblox has received generally positive reviews from critics, it has faced criticism for its moderation and microtransactions and accusations of exploitative practices directed toward children.

Overview

Roblox Studio 

Roblox allows players to create their own games using its proprietary engine, Roblox Studio, which can then be played by other users. Games (called "experiences" by the corporation) are made with a derivative of the language Lua named Luau. Users are able to create purchasable content through one-time purchases, known as "game passes", as well as microtransactions which can be purchased more than once, known as "developer products" or "products". The majority of games produced using Roblox Studio are developed by minors, and a total of 20 million games a year are produced using it.

Items and currency 

Roblox allows players to buy, sell, and create virtual items which can be used to decorate their virtual character that serves as their avatar on the platform. Clothes can be bought by anyone, but only players with a Premium membership can sell them. Only Roblox administrators can sell accessories, body parts, gear, and packages under the official Roblox user account; virtual hats and accessories can also be published by a select few users with past experience working with Roblox Corporation. Several individuals design items as a full-time job, with the highest-earning creators making over $100,000 a year off item sales. Items with a limited edition status can only be traded between or sold by users with a Roblox Premium membership.

Robux allows players to buy various items, and are obtained by purchase with real currency, from a recurring stipend given to members with a Premium membership, and from other players by producing and selling virtual content in Roblox. Prior to 2016, Roblox had another currency, Tix (short for "Tickets"), that was discontinued in April of that year. Robux acquired through the sale of user-generated content can be exchanged into real-world currency through the website's Developer Exchange system. There are a sizable amount of scams relating to Robux, largely revolving around automated messages promoting scam websites, scam games designed to appear to give out free Robux, and invalid Robux codes.

Events 
Roblox occasionally hosts real-life and virtual events. They have in the past hosted events such as BloxCon, which was a convention for ordinary players on the platform. Roblox operates annual Easter egg hunts and also hosts an annual event called the “Bloxy Awards”, an awards ceremony that also functions as a fundraiser. The 2020 edition of the Bloxy Awards, held virtually on the platform, drew 600,000 viewers. Roblox Corporation annually hosts the Roblox Developers Conference, a three-day invite-only event in San Francisco where top content creators on the site learn of upcoming changes to the platform. The company has also hosted similar events in London and Amsterdam.

Roblox occasionally engages in events to promote films, such as ones held to promote Wonder Woman 1984 and Aquaman. In 2020, Roblox hosted its first virtual concert, which was compared by Rolling Stone to that of American rapper Travis Scott's virtual concert in Fortnite, during which American rapper Lil Nas X debuted his song "Holiday" to an audience of Roblox players. In 2021, Swedish singer Zara Larsson performed songs at a virtual party to celebrate her the reissuing of her album Poster Girl. On September 17, 2021, a virtual concert by the American band Twenty One Pilots took place. In October 2021, Roblox partnered with Chipotle Mexican Grill to give $1 million of burritos away to the first 30,000 people every day as a part of Chipotle's Halloween Boorito promotion.

History and development 

The beta version of Roblox was created by co-founders David Baszucki and Erik Cassel in 2004 under the name DynaBlocks. Baszucki started testing the first demos that year. In 2005, the company changed its name to Roblox, and it officially launched on September 1, 2006. In March 2007, Roblox became compliant with COPPA, with the addition of safe chat, a change that limited the communication ability of users under the age of 13 by restricting them to selecting predefined messages from a menu. In August, Roblox applied server improvements and released a premium membership service named "Builders Club". This paid membership feature was rebranded as Roblox Premium in September 2019.

In December 2011, Roblox held its first Hack Week, an annual event where Roblox developers work on outside-the-box ideas for new developments to present to the company. On December 11, 2012, an iOS version of Roblox was released, and on July 16, 2014, an Android version was released. On October 1, 2013, Roblox released its Developer Exchange program, allowing developers to exchange Robux earned from their games into real-world currencies.

On May 31, 2015, a feature called 'Smooth Terrain' was added, increasing the graphical fidelity of the terrain and changing the physics engine from a block-oriented style to a smoother and more realistic one. On November 20, Roblox was launched on Xbox One, with an initial selection of 15 games chosen by Roblox staff. New Roblox games for the Xbox One have to go through an approval process and are subject to the Entertainment Software Ratings Board standards.

In April 2016, Roblox launched Roblox VR for Oculus Rift. At the time of release, more than ten million games were available in 3D. Around the same time period, the safe chat feature was removed and replaced by a system based on a whitelist with a set of acceptable words for users under 13 years old and a set of blacklisted words for other users. In June, the company launched a version compatible with Windows 10. While the game platform has had a presence on the PC since 2004, when its web version was created, this was the first time it was upgraded with a standalone launcher built for Windows.

Throughout 2017, Roblox engaged in a number of updates to its server technology, as the technology they were operating on until that point was out of date and led to frequent outages. Also in 2017, Roblox closed its official forums. In November 2018, the ability for a player to play as a "guest", without an account, which had been progressively restricted over the previous two years, was removed entirely. In July 2020, Roblox announced the creation of “Party Place”, which functions as an online hangout. The feature was created using new technology that had been used during the 2020 Bloxy Awards and was designed in response to the COVID-19 pandemic. Roblox was granted permission to release in China on December 3, 2020. In October 2021, Roblox experienced its longest downtime to date, with services being unavailable for three days.

In December of 2021 Roblox shut down its Chinese servers, stating that they were attempting to create "another version" of the app that allowed Chinese players to access the platform. In July 2022, an archive of internal documents related to the platform's activities in China were leaked by an unidentified hacker. This document revealed that the Roblox Corporation had planned to roll out a variety of changes to the platform in order to comply with Chinese internet censorship laws, and that prior to shutting their operations in China they had been concerned that Tencent would hack the platform and attempt to set up a competitor. In September 2022, Roblox Corporation announced that it planned to add an age rating system, which would allow for moderate portrayals of violence in games flagged as suitable for players aged 13 and over. The company stated that it was wanting to increase the platform's appeal to a young adult audience of users 17–24, which it stated was the fastest-growing demographic on Roblox.

Community and culture

Activism
Users of Roblox have been noted for their efforts against racism, with numerous regular users and co-founder Baszucki having declared their support for the George Floyd protests and Black Lives Matter. In August 2019, an investigation by NBC News revealed over 100 accounts linked to far-right and neo-Nazi groups. After being contacted about the accounts by NBC, Roblox moderators removed them.

Effects of the COVID-19 pandemic
The COVID-19 pandemic has affected Roblox in numerous ways. Due to quarantines imposed by the pandemic limiting social interaction, Roblox is being used as a way for children to communicate with each other. One of the most noted ways that this method of communication is being carried out is the phenomenon of birthday parties being held on the platform. COVID-19 has caused a substantial increase in both the platform's revenue and the number of players on it, in line with similar effects experienced by the majority of the gaming industry, as players forced to remain indoors due to COVID-19 lockdowns spent more time playing video games.

"Oof" sound effect
From its release until November 2020, Robloxs sound effect for when a character dies was an "oof" sound, which became a substantial part of the platform's reputation due to its status as a meme. The sound was originally produced by the studio of video game composer Tommy Tallarico for the 2000 video game Messiah, and he and Roblox entered into a copyright dispute. The dispute ended in 2022 when Roblox pulled the sound from their platform and replaced it with a new sound effect.

Reception and revenue

Critical reception
Roblox has generally received positive reviews. Common Sense Media gave it 4 out of 5 stars, praising the website's variety of games and ability to encourage creativity in children while finding that the decentralized nature of the platform meant game quality varied, and recommended disabling chat functions for young players to prevent possibly harmful interactions. Patricia E. Vance of the Family Online Safety Institute advised parents to monitor their child's interactions on the platform but praised the platform for "…allowing kids to play, explore, socialize, create and learn in a self-directed way", and granting special praise to Roblox Studio for its ability to encourage children to experience game development. Trusted Reviews, in its overview of the platform, also praised Roblox Studio, stating that “for anyone seeking to develop their computer science skills, or create projects that will instantly receive feedback from a huge audience, the appeal is obvious”. Craig Hurda, writing in Android Guys, gave a more moderate review, praising the number of games available and finding that the game was entertaining for children, while also finding that the platform's audio was "hit-or-miss" and declaring that it had limited appeal for adult players.

Criticism 
Roblox has received widespread criticism for its chat filtration system. Although Robloxs filtration system, Community Sift, censors and removes most inappropriate messages and content, some can still avoid the system. To combat these issues, Roblox has 1,600 people working to remove such content from the platform. Roblox offers privacy settings; parents can limit what people a user can contact, restrict access to private servers, and turn on parental controls.

Though sexual content is prohibited on Roblox, the platform has received substantial criticism for the presence of sexually explicit games and imagery within it. This content includes items such as virtual sex clubs and nightclubs, with creators of said content largely communicating through third-party platforms which cannot be regulated by Roblox moderators. A 2020 investigation by Fast Company found that sexual content was still prevalent within Roblox, with attempts by moderators to remove it being likened to "whack-a-mole", though it was also found that the situation had generally improved in the recent years prior to the report. In an October 2022 interview, Roblox Chief Scientist Morgan McGuire stated that it's "a challenge to moderate 3D," and also compared moderating Roblox to shutting down speakeasys.

Roblox has also been criticised for making it easy for children to spend large sums of money through microtransactions, leading to numerous instances where children have spent large sums of money on the platform without parents' knowledge, and deleting the accounts of players who file chargebacks or request refunds for Robux payments through their banks, card issuers or other third-party companies. Professor Jane Juffer at Cornell University accused Roblox of encouraging consumerism in children.

Roblox has been accused by the investigative journalism YouTube channel People Make Games of "exploiting" child game developers by promising them huge amounts of money when they monetize their games, while only giving them little to no money in return by having high revenue cuts, an exchange rate in selling Robux lower than the rate for buying Robux, and lack of methods to make their games easily discoverable. This was likened to company scrip. In a discussion with Axios, Roblox’s chief product officer (CPO) Manuel Bronstein responded by saying that Roblox intends to give more money to its community developers. After Roblox requested the channel to take down the video, People Make Games released further accusations of practices endangering child safety, accusing the platform of practices such as a lack of oversight of developers and a method for people to address developer abuse, leading to child developers being exploited for labor on third-party platforms, allowing a developer to seemingly continue monetizing and having control of game development despite having their personal account banned for reportedly sexually preying on a child, running the collectibles market to function like gambling, and refusing to help a developer whose account was hacked and had its collectibles and assets stolen and encouraging children to seek unofficial and unsafe trading sites to easily obtain highly valuable items.

In April 2022, Truth in Advertising filed a complaint against Roblox with the Federal Trade Commission for deceptive marketing.

Games 

Due to its status as a games platform, Roblox has a variety of popular games. As of May 2020, the most popular games on Roblox had over 10 million monthly active players each. As of August 2020, at least 20 games had been played more than one billion times, and at least 5,000 have been played more than one million times. TechCrunch noted in March 2021 that Roblox games are largely distinct from established traditions in free-to-play video games, finding that successful Roblox games were geared towards immediate satisfaction, and finding that the addition of tutorials significantly decreased player engagement, contrary to established wisdom about free-to-play games.

Revenue
During the 2017 Roblox Developers Conference, officials said that creators on the game platform, of which there were about 1.7 million as of 2017, collectively earned at least $30 million in 2017. The iOS version of Roblox passed $1 billion of lifetime revenue in November 2019,. $1.5 billion in June 2020, and $2 billion in October 2020, making it the iOS app with the second-highest revenue. Several individual games on Roblox have accumulated revenues of over $10 million, while developers as a whole on the platform were collectively projected to have earned around $250 million over the course of 2020.

Toy lines 
In January 2017, toy fabricator Jazwares partnered with Roblox Corporation to produce toy minifigures based on user-generated content created by developers on the platform. The minifigures have limbs and joints similar to that of Lego minifigures, though they are about twice the size. The minifigures have limbs and accessories that are interchangeable. The sets included a code that was used to redeem virtual items, as well as blind boxes that contained random minifigures. In 2019, Roblox Corporation released a new line of toys, branded the "Roblox Desktop" series. On April 13, 2021, Roblox partnered with Hasbro to release Roblox-themed Nerf guns and a Roblox-themed Monopoly edition.

References

External links 
 

 
2006 video games
Android (operating system) games
Free online games
Internet memes introduced in the 2010s
Internet properties established in 2006
IOS games
Lua (programming language)-scripted video games
Lua (programming language)-scriptable game engines
MacOS games
Massively multiplayer online games
Active massively multiplayer online games
Virtual world communities
Online games
Social simulation video games
Windows games
Xbox One games
Video game engines
Video game development software
Video games developed in the United States